Ivory Coast competed at the 1996 Summer Olympics in Atlanta, United States.

Results by event

Athletics

Men 

Track and road events

Canoeing

Sprint 

Men

Judo 

Men

Women

Tennis 

Men

Men

References

External links
 

Nations at the 1996 Summer Olympics
1996
Oly